Walter Laufer (July 5, 1906 – July 16, 1984) was an American swimmer who competed at the 1928 Summer Olympics in Amsterdam. He won a gold medal in the 4×200 meter freestyle relay and a silver in the 100 meter backstroke.  He was also fifth in the 100 meter freestyle event. Laufer was inducted into the International Swimming Hall of Fame as an "Honor Swimmer" in 1973.

Personal life
Laufer was married three times.  He married Geneivieve Kleinofen around 1929 and had two children with her – a son and a daughter.  Genievieve contracted intestinal influenza and died of complications from the disease January 8, 1934. In 1936, Laufer married Marion Hengestenberg; they had one daughter.  Marion died suddenly in 1972. Two years later in 1974 Walter married Wanda Cord Bockhorst, a widow living in Cincinnati. Laufer died on July 16, 1984, at age 78 in Midland, Texas while visiting his son.  He is buried in Cincinnati, Ohio.

See also
 List of members of the International Swimming Hall of Fame
 List of Olympic medalists in swimming (men)
 World record progression 4 × 200 metres freestyle relay

References

1906 births
1984 deaths
American male backstroke swimmers
American male freestyle swimmers
World record setters in swimming
Olympic gold medalists for the United States in swimming
Olympic silver medalists for the United States in swimming
Swimmers from Cincinnati
Swimmers at the 1928 Summer Olympics
Medalists at the 1928 Summer Olympics
20th-century American people